Drummer was an American indie rock band from Akron, Ohio. The band was founded by The Black Keys' drummer Patrick Carney who plays bass guitar.  All the members of the band are drummers in other groups from Ohio.

History
In February 2009, Carney created the group with Jamie Stillman, the drummer from Teeth of the Hydra after Carney's fellow Black Keys member Dan Auerbach was on tour for his debut solo album, Keep It Hid. Stillman had wanted the band to have a happy, upbeat vibe and suggested Jon Finley from Party of Helicopters and Beaten Awake to sing and play guitar. Steven Clements from Houseguest joined, playing keyboard and also providing back-up vocals. Soon, the band found Greg Boyd of Ghostman & Sandman to play drums. The band recorded their first album in Carney's hometown of Akron, Ohio, with sound engineer Ben Vehorn, notable for his work in bands Love as Laughter and Houseguest.

Band members
Patrick Carney - bass guitar
Gregory Boyd - drums
Steve Clements - vocals, keyboards
Jon Finley - vocals, guitar
Jamie Stillman - guitar

Discography
Studio album
Feel Good Together - 2009

See also
Music of Ohio
The Black Keys

References

Rock music supergroups
Musical groups established in 2009
Musical groups from Akron, Ohio